Plagiomnium is a genus of mosses in the family Mniaceae. It was formerly a part of a more encompassing genus Mnium and in 1968 Finish bryologist Timo Juhani Koponen justified splitting the genus into a number of smaller genera.

Description
This genus is characterized by singly placed marginal teeth. 

Plagiomnium are commonlyg found along shaded stream banks, seeps and springs, generally on soil with a high humus content.

Species

The genus Plagiomnium contains the following species:

Plagiomnium acutum 
Plagiomnium affine 
Plagiomnium arbusculum 
Plagiomnium carolinianum 
Plagiomnium ciliare 
Plagiomnium cinclidioides 
Plagiomnium confertidens 
Plagiomnium cordatum 
Plagiomnium cuspidatum 
Plagiomnium drummondii 
Plagiomnium ecklonii 
Plagiomnium elatum 
Plagiomnium elimbatum 
Plagiomnium ellipticum 
Plagiomnium insigne 
Plagiomnium integroradiatum 
Plagiomnium integrum 
Plagiomnium japonicum 
Plagiomnium kawadei 
Plagiomnium maximoviczii 
Plagiomnium medium 
Plagiomnium novae-zealandiae 
Plagiomnium prorepens 
Plagiomnium rhynchophorum 
Plagiomnium rostratum 
Plagiomnium rugicum 
Plagiomnium speciosum 
Plagiomnium subelimbatum 
Plagiomnium succulentum 
Plagiomnium tezukae 
Plagiomnium trichomanes 
Plagiomnium undulatum 
Plagiomnium venustum 
Plagiomnium vesicatum

References

Mniaceae
Moss genera